Dragon's Gold is a 1954 American crime film directed by Aubrey Wisberg and Jack Pollexfen and starring John Archer, Hillary Brooke and Philip Van Zandt.

Plot

Cast
John Archer as Mack Rossiter
Hillary Brooke as Vivian Crosby
Noel Cravat as General Wong Kai Hai
Philip Van Zandt as Sen
Marvin Press as Cheng
Dayton Lumis as Donald McCutcheon
 William Kerwin as 	Gene

References

External links
 
 
 

1954 films
1954 crime drama films
American crime drama films
Films produced by Edward Small
Films scored by Albert Glasser
United Artists films
Films produced by Aubrey Wisberg
Films directed by Aubrey Wisberg
Films with screenplays by Aubrey Wisberg
1950s English-language films
American black-and-white films
1950s American films